Tratramarina is a rural commune in Anosibe An'ala District, in Alaotra-Mangoro Region, Madagascar.

Religion
FJKM - Fiangonan'i Jesoa Kristy eto Madagasikara (Church of Jesus Christ in Madagascar)

Agriculture
Main crops are rice, manioc, coffee, Cloves, peanuts and honey.

References

Populated places in Alaotra-Mangoro